Greenwich, New York may refer to:

Greenwich (village), New York, in Washington County
Greenwich (town), New York, in Washington County
Greenwich Village, in New York City